Kordofan is a former province of central Sudan. In 1994 it was divided into three new federal states: North Kordofan, South Kordofan and West Kordofan. In August 2005, West Kordofan State was abolished and its territory divided between North and South Kordofan States, as part of the implementation of the Comprehensive Peace Agreement between the Government of Sudan and the Sudan People's Liberation Movement. West Kordofan was reestablished in July 2013.

Geography
Kordofan covers an area of some 376,145 km² (146,932 miles²), with an estimated population in 2000 of 3.6 million (3 million in 1983). It is largely an undulating plain, with the Nuba Mountains in the southeast quarter. During the rainy season from June to September, the area is fertile, but in the dry season, it is virtually desert. The region’s chief town is El-Obeid.

Economy and demography
Traditionally the area is known for production of gum arabic. Other crops include groundnuts, cotton and millet. The main tribal groups are Arab tribes, such as Dar Hamid, Kawahla, Hamar, Bedairiah, Joamaah and Rekabeiah. In Northern Kordofan there are large grazing areas used and inhabited for hundreds of years by Arabic-speaking, semi-nomadic Baggara and camel-raising Kababish. Nilotic tribes, Nuba, Shilluk and Dinka, also inhabit parts of Kordofan.

The Kordofanian languages are spoken by a small minority in southern Kordofan and are unique to the region, as are the Kadu languages, but Arabic is the main and most widely spoken language in the greater Kordofan region.

History

Before 1840

About the beginning of the 16th century, Funj from Sennar settled in the country; toward the end of that century, Kordofan was conquered by Sulayman Solong, Sultan of Darfur. In 1779, Sultan Adlan II of Sennar sent Sheikh Nacib, with two thousand cavalry, to take possession of the country, which remained for about five years under the government of Sennar. There followed a considerable immigration of Arab tribes and native people from Sennar and Dongola (see old Dongola) into the country. The Sennari however suffered a decisive defeat in 1784 and thereafter under Darfur viceroys the country enjoyed prosperity. The inhabitants lived in peace and were not troubled with taxes; the merchants were exempt from duties, and the tribute paid was a voluntary present to the Sultan of Darfur. Bara, the second commercial town of importance in the country, was built by the Dongolavi. Commerce extended in all directions. Caravans brought products from Abyssinia and Egypt into Lobeid and Bara, from which the greater part was again transported on to other parts of Africa. This prosperity ended in 1821 when Mehemet Ali, Ottoman Viceroy of Egypt sent his son-in-law, Mahommed Bey the Defturdar, with about 4,500 soldiers and eight pieces of artillery, to subject Kordofan to his power. The monopoly enjoyed by the Egyptian governors in Kordofan impeded trade and stifled entrepreneurial activities.

From 1837 to 1839, the country was explored by Ignaz Pallme.

After 1840

The Mahdi captured El-Obeid in 1883. The Egyptian government dispatched a force from Cairo under the British General William Hicks, which was ambushed and annihilated at Sheikan to the south of El Obeid. Following British reoccupation in 1898, Kordofan was added to the number of provinces of the Sudan.

In 1973 it was split into the provinces (mudiriya) of North Kordofan and South Kordofan, which became states (wilayat) in 1994. In 2011, armed conflict in South Kordofan broke out in June 2011, ahead of independence for South Sudan. Fighting has since involved rebel groups in Darfur and has expanded into North Kordofan.

See also 
 Kordofanian languages

Notes and references

Further reading
 MacMichael, Harold Alfred (1882) The tribes of Northern and Central Kordofán Cambridge University Press, Cambridge, England, ; reprinted by Frank Cass, London (1967), as part of the series Cass Library of African studies 1912 edition
 United States. Congress. House. Committee on Foreign Affairs. Subcommittee on Africa, Global Health, and Human Rights. Southern Kordofan: Ethnic Cleansing and Humanitarian Crisis in Sudan: Hearing before the Subcommittee on Africa, Global Health, and Human Rights of the Committee on Foreign Affairs, House of Representatives, One Hundred Twelfth Congress, First Session, August 4, 2011. Washington, D.C.: U.S. G.P.O., 2011.

External links
The Nuba Mountains Homepage

History of Sudan
Regions of Sudan
 
1898 establishments in the British Empire